Yonder Is The Clock is The Felice Brothers' sixth album and their second major release. It was released on April 7, 2009.

Reception

Yonder Is the Clock received positive reviews from critics. On Metacritic, the album holds a score of 84 out of 100 based on 14 reviews, indicating "universal acclaim."

Track listing
"The Big Surprise" - 4:24
"Penn Station" - 4:00
"Buried In Ice" - 3:13
"Chicken Wire" - 2:45
"Ambulance Man" - 5:29
"Sailor Song" - 3:32
"Katie Dear" - 4:01
"Run Chicken Run" - 5:02
"All When We Were Young" - 3:27
"Boy From Lawrence County" - 5:23
"Memphis Flu" - 3:04
"Cooperstown" - 6:16
"Rise and Shine" - 4:25

References

2009 albums
The Felice Brothers albums
Team Love Records albums